Barabanki–Lucknow Suburban Railway is a commuter rail service operated by Northern Railways, North Central Railway and North Eastern Railway to connect Lucknow with Barabanki. These services are mostly run using EMU and MEMU rakes. However it does not have dedicated suburban tracks but share the tracks with long distance trains. Locally it is called BL meaning Barabanki Lucknow (while LC means Lucknow Cawnpore).

Distance and time
Distance between Lucknow (LKO) and Barabanki Jn (BBK) is 28–29 km (NR route).
Distance between Lucknow Jn (LJN) and Barabanki Jn (BBK) is 36–37 km (NER route).
Most of the LSB trains cover the whole journey within 50 minutes via NR route (28–29 km) (NR route).
Most of the LGB trains cover the whole journey within 1 hour 30 minutes via NER route (36–37 km) (NER route).
Intercity and other Superfast trains take 40 minutes to 1 hour 10 minutes. (Amrapali Express takes exactly 40 minutes for whole journey while Ganga Sutlej Express takes exactly 1 hour 10 minutes.)

MEMU/EMU and passenger trains

Barabanki to Lucknow

NR route

NER route

Lucknow to Barabanki

NR route

NER route

See also
Lucknow–Kanpur Suburban Railway
Cawnpore–Barabanki Railway
Barabanki Junction
Lucknow Charbagh railway station
Indian Railways

References

External links
 

Transport in Barabanki, Uttar Pradesh
Transport in Lucknow
Suburban rail in India
Rail transport in Uttar Pradesh